Italian hospital ship Marechiaro was a steam ship originally built by an Italian shipping company, but requisitioned for use as an Italian hospital ship during the First World War. On February 21, 1916 she was sunk near the Albanian port of Durrës by a mine laid by the German U-boat . British drifters Hasting Castle and Selina saved 104 men from the water while 33 were killed. Other sources mention over 200 casualties.

Sinking
During the war  operated as a minelayer, and undertook 7 patrols in this role. 
Mines laid by UC-12  were credited with sinking 6 ships.  One of these, the Italian Marechiaro sunk on 21 February 1916 and was listed as a hospital ship. Since Germany was not at war with Italy at this stage, though Austria was, UC 12, like other German U-boats in the Mediterranean, operated under the Austrian flag.

See also
 List of hospital ships sunk in World War I

References

External links
 Marechiaro Marina Militare website 

World War I shipwrecks in the Adriatic Sea
Maritime incidents in 1916
Hospital ships in World War I
Ships built in Ancona
Ships built by Cantieri Navali del Tirreno e Riuniti
Ships sunk by mines
1912 ships
World War I naval ships of Italy